Lyndsay Ryan Kahler (born June 4, 1974) is an American beauty pageant titleholder who was crowned Miss California 1996 and competed at Miss America 1997.

References

Living people
American beauty pageant winners
People from Alameda, California
Miss America 1997 delegates
1974 births
20th-century American people